Marcus S. Vaughn (born in North Attleboro, Massachusetts) is the current member of the Massachusetts House of Representatives for the 9th Norfolk district. Vaughn has represented the district since 2023.

Early Life and Education 
Vaughn attended North Attleboro High School. He participated actively in the school's football, basketball, and track and field programs. As a student he was a member of SADD and served as a volunteer middle school track coach. Marcus, a first generation college student, later attended Syracuse University on a full athletic scholarship. He then went to California State University, Monterey Bay from 2012 to 2014, and earned a Master of Business Administration in international business with a GPA of 3.62.

In his professional career, Vaughn has worked for Dycem Ltd, Brady Corporation, and most recently REP Marketing Solutions.

Massachusetts House of Representatives 
Vaughn was elected to the State House in 2022, defeating Democratic Norfolk Select Board member Kevin Kalkut in the 2022 General Election.

Rep. Vaughn serves as the ranking minority on the House Committee on Operations, Facilities and Security and a member on the Joint Committee on Public Safety and Homeland Security.

Electoral History 
 }}

See also 

 2023–2024 Massachusetts legislature

References 

Republican Party members of the Massachusetts House of Representatives
People from Wrentham, Massachusetts
Living people
21st-century American politicians